Estonia has been participating at the Deaflympics since 1993 and  has earned a total of 32 medals.

Medal tallies

Summer Deaflympics

See also
Estonia at the Paralympics
Estonia at the Olympics

References

External links
Deaflympics official website
2017 Deaflympics

Nations at the Deaflympics
Estonia at multi-sport events
Parasports in Estonia